"A. B. and C." is an episode of the allegorical British science fiction TV series The Prisoner. It was written by Anthony Skene and directed by Pat Jackson and eleventh produced. It was the third episode to be broadcast in the UK on ITV (ATV Midlands and Grampian) on Friday 13 October 1967 and first aired in the United States on CBS on Saturday 22 June 1968.

The episode stars Patrick McGoohan as Number Six and features as Number Two Colin Gordon – the only actor other than Leo McKern who would play Number Two in more than one episode.

Plot summary
Number Two is directed by Number One to step up efforts to extract information from Number Six—specifically relating to what information he is believed to have sold, leading to his resignation from the intelligence agency he worked for. Number Two directs Number Fourteen to prepare a machine she has developed. With the help of an injected drug, it will allow  observation of, and influence on, the dream-state of a person connected to it. They have prepared three dossiers of foreign agents that Number Six was known to have met during an elegant party hosted by Madame Engadine prior to his resignation, suspecting that he has sold out to one of them. The dossiers are labelled "A", "B", and "C".

On the first two nights, Number Six is sedated through his evening tea, brought to Number Fourteen's laboratory, injected with the drug, and connected to the machine. Numbers Two and Fourteen watch events unfold in Number Six's visions of the party, and then insert, separately, the dossiers for "A" and "B", agents with known ties to Number Six. During the first night with "A", a defector, Number Six refuses to sell his secrets to "A", and then escapes from being kidnapped by "A" and his henchmen. During the second night with "B", a female spy, Number Six avoids answering her questions regarding his departure. Number Fourteen uses the machine to speak directly to Number Six via "B", but he becomes suspicious and when "B" is threatened by hostile agents to be killed, he does not stop to save her. Number Two determines that neither "A" nor "B" is the person they seek, and Number Six is returned each night to his home. After the second night, dim memories of the experiment lead Number Six to follow Number Fourteen around the Village, eventually coming across her laboratory. He dilutes the final injection after verifying the dossier for "C". That (third) night, Number Six fakes drinking the drugged tea, and instead acts drugged before he is taken back to the laboratory.

Number Two uses the final dossier on "C", whose true identity is unknown beyond ties to Number Six, with the dream state machine. The visions they see of the event are blurred and distorted, a factor that Number Fourteen attributes to the repeated use of the process. In the dream, it is revealed that "C" is really Madame Engadine, but she explains that she must take him to her superior, whom Number Fourteen calls "D". To Number Two's shock, Number Six reveals that "D" is Number Two. As Numbers Two and Fourteen watch in surprise, they discover that Number Six has full control of his dream state. He returns to the Village and the laboratory and speaks directly to the dream versions of Numbers Two and Fourteen. He hands the dream version of Number Two an envelope which they had believed to contain secret information to sell, but which turns out to be simply travel brochures, and explains that his resignation was not due to having sold out. As the dream ends, the broken Number Two is startled as the phone from Number One ominously rings.

Cast

 Colin Gordon . . . Number Two
 Sheila Allen . . . Number Fourteen
 Peter Bowles . . . A
 Annette Carell . . . B
 Katherine Kath . . . Madame Engadine
 Georgina Cookson . . . Blonde Lady
 Lucille Soong . . . Flower girl
 Bettina Le Beau (credited as "Bettine Le Beau") . . . Maid at party
 Terry Yorke . . . First thug
 Peter Brayham . . . Second thug
 Bill Cummings . . . Henchman

Broadcast
The broadcast date of the episode varied in different ITV regions of the UK.

Scottish Television originally scheduled the episode to be broadcast on Friday 19 October, one week after the previous episode "The Chimes of Big Ben". However, a power cut hit the Scottish station that evening, preventing the episode from being broadcast. The following Friday, Scottish continued with "Free For All", thus deviating from the standard UK broadcast order. Scottish Television eventually broadcast "A, B and C" on Thursday 23 November, as the seventh episode, one week after "Many Happy Returns" and one week before "Dance of the Dead".

The aggregate viewing figures for the ITV regions that debuted the season in 1967 have been estimated at 10.9 million. In Northern Ireland, the episode did not debut until Saturday 20 January 1968, and in Wales, the episode was not broadcast until Wednesday 21 January 1970.

Chronology with the episode "The General"

While it is never definitively indicated whether the Number Two in this episode is the same Number Two also played by Colin Gordon in "The General", there is enough evidence to suggest that he is. "The General" was the tenth episode of the series produced, and "A. B. and C." the eleventh. Moreover, in the opening sequence of "A. B. and C.", when Number Six asks "Who are you?" Number Two replies "I am Number Two." This would indicate he is still the same Number Two from the previous episode, as at the beginning of "The General", he states he is "The new Number Two."  From the outset of "A. B. and C." Number Two is clearly on edge, and throughout appears somewhat more desperate than others in the position to break Number Six, indicating that he faces dire consequences if he fails to do so, possibly exacerbated by his failure in "The General".  Other points of reference include the fact that in both episodes this Number Two enjoys drinking milk, and they concern experiments that involve manipulating the mind.

A possible argument that "The General" follows "A. B. and C." is the fact Colin Gordon's Number Two in "The General" describes himself and Number Six as "old friends", which suggests this was the second time they had met in The Village. However, the prior evidence would appear to disprove this. This gives rise to the interesting possibility that this Number Two actually knew Number Six outside of The Village in his former career, and might explain why this Number Two was then given a second chance. This also reinforces the special status of Number Six within The Village.

In actual broadcast order, "A. B. and C." was the third episode shown while "The General" was broadcast as the sixth. If the Number Two of each of the two shows is the same character, it would illustrate some of the production problems faced by the show; the Number Two of "A. B. and C." is clearly close to the end of his tenure, and this would indicate that this episode must follow "The General" in chronology. The principal problem with the broadcast chronology is that in the conclusion of "A. B. and C.," it seems that Number Two is to be replaced for not providing the mental in-roads to Number Six as he likely offered. His existence in "The General" may perhaps be explained as indeed, a 'one-time' reprieve.

Notes
 Skene re-worked his script for this episode as an instalment of the BBC's Counterstrike series in 1969, entitled Nocturne.
 When the episode was repeated by Channel 4 in 1993 a badly abridged print was screened, omitting all of Number Fourteen's manipulation of B.

See also
Inception - a 2010 science fiction film, which deals with infiltrating the subconcious through shared dreams.
The Three Stigmata of Palmer Eldritch

References

Sources
  – script of episode

External links

The Prisoner episodes
Television episodes about virtual reality
1967 British television episodes
Television episodes about dreams
Television episodes directed by Pat Jackson

fr:A, B et C (Le Prisonnier)
it:Episodi de Il prigioniero#Dormire, forse sognare